The Hidden is a 1987 American science fiction horror film directed by Jack Sholder, written by Jim Kouf (under the pseudonym Bob Hunt), and released by New Line Cinema. It stars Kyle MacLachlan and Michael Nouri, along with Clu Gulager, Chris Mulkey, Ed O'Ross, Clarence Felder, Claudia Christian and Larry Cedar, and received mostly positive reviews. A sequel, The Hidden II, was directed by Seth Pinsker and released in 1993.

Plot
Jack DeVries (Chris Mulkey), a quiet citizen with no criminal past, robs a Los Angeles Wells Fargo bank, kills all of the security guards inside, and leads the Los Angeles Police Department on a high-speed chase. The chase ends when DeVries encounters a police blockade overseen by Detective Thomas Beck (Michael Nouri). DeVries is shot several times, smashes through the blockade and crashes the Ferrari he is driving. DeVries is taken to a hospital, where a doctor informs Beck and his partner, Det. Cliff Willis (Ed O'Ross) that DeVries is not expected to survive the night.

Upon his return to LAPD headquarters, Beck and his supervisor, Lt. John Masterson (Clarence Felder), meet FBI Special Agent Lloyd Gallagher (Kyle MacLachlan), who informs them that Beck has been assigned to work with Gallagher to track down DeVries. When told of DeVries's condition, Gallagher rushes off to the hospital.

Meanwhile, at the hospital, DeVries suddenly awakens. Disconnecting his life-support equipment, he approaches the comatose man in the next bed, Jonathan P. Miller (William Boyett). After DeVries forces Miller's mouth open, a slug-like alien emerges from DeVries' mouth and transfers itself into Miller's body. Gallagher arrives to find DeVries dead on the floor and Miller's bed abandoned. Gallagher tells Beck to put out an alert on Miller, but Beck refuses, because Miller has no criminal record.

Miller goes to a record store where he beats the store's owner to death. He then goes to a car dealership, where he kills three men and steals a red Ferrari. He then visits a strip club, where the alien leaves Miller's body and takes over the body of a stripper named Brenda (Claudia Christian). Gallagher asks police to track Brenda when he sees her picture next to Miller's body. Brenda is then propositioned by a cat-caller, she accepts and follows him to his car. They proceed to have sex in his car which results in his death. She then takes his car. Gallagher and Beck pursue her to a rooftop, where they mortally wound her in a gun battle. As Brenda dies, Gallagher points a strangely-shaped, alien weapon at her; however, she leaps from the roof. As Masterson arrives from his house to take charge of the scene, the alien transfers itself from Brenda's dying body to Masterson's dog.

Frustrated by Gallagher's continuing refusal to explain the strange phenomenon of ordinary citizens turning into crazed killers, Beck arrests him and puts him in a jail cell. Beck soon learns that "Gallagher" is an imposter, impersonating the real agent Gallagher, who is dead. When Beck confronts "Gallagher" with this information, "Gallagher" admits to being an extraterrestrial lawman and that they are in fact pursuing an alien thrill killer who has the ability to take over other's bodies. Beck dismisses the story as insane and leaves "Gallagher" in a jail cell at the police station.

Back at Masterson's house, the alien leaves the dog's body and enters Masterson. In the morning, Masterson goes to the police station and seizes a number of weapons, sparking a shootout between himself and the station's police officers as he attempts to track down "Gallagher". Convinced of "Gallagher's" story due to Masterson's immunity to excessive bullet wounds, Beck releases him from jail, and the two confront Masterson. During the resulting shootout, Masterson confirms that "Gallagher" is an alien law enforcer named Alhague who has been pursuing the alien ever since it murdered his family and his partner on another planet. When Alhague first came to Earth, he inhabited the body of Robert Stone, a park ranger, then assumed the identity of Lloyd Gallagher after the real Gallagher was killed in a fire. Though Beck manages to stop Masterson, Alhague/Gallagher reveals that his weapon cannot kill the alien when it is inside a human body; the weapon does not work on human skin, thus requiring him to be present when it is transferring hosts. They are unable to stop the alien from abandoning Masterson's body for that of Beck's partner Willis, who then escapes the station.

Using Willis' credentials, the alien tries to gain access to Senator Holt (John McCann), a likely presidential candidate. Alhague/Gallagher and Beck follow Willis, and a shootout ensues between Beck and Willis. Beck is severely wounded. As Willis, the alien corners Senator Holt and enters his body before Alhague/Gallagher can stop him. "Holt" then calls a press conference and announces his candidacy for the presidency. Alhague/Gallagher is forced to attack Holt in the middle of the press conference. Though shot several times by the police and the senator's bodyguards, Alhague/Gallagher is able to get close enough to use a flamethrower on Holt. The alien emerges from Holt's charred body, shocking everybody before collapsing. Alhague/Gallagher kills it with his weapon.

Taken to the hospital where Beck is being treated, Alhague/Gallagher discovers that Beck is close to death. Witnessing the emotional suffering of Beck's wife and daughter, Alhague/Gallagher transfers his life force from Gallagher to Beck as Beck dies. When she sees her miraculously "recovered" father, Beck's daughter initially hesitates when he reaches out to her, but then smiles and takes his hand.

Cast

 Kyle MacLachlan as Agent Lloyd Gallagher/Robert Stone/Alhague
 Michael Nouri as Det. Thomas Beck
 Richard Brooks as Det. Sanchez
 Claudia Christian as Brenda Lee Van Buren
 Chris Mulkey as Jack DeVries
 William Boyett as Jonathan P. Miller
 John McCann as Senator Holt
 Clarence Felder as Lt. John Masterson
 Clu Gulager as Lt. Ed Flynn
 Ed O'Ross as Det. Cliff Willis
 Steve Eastin as Agent Stadt
 Katherine Cannon as Barbara Beck
 Larry Cedar as Brem
 James Luisi as Ferrari Salesman 
 Danny Trejo as a prisoner
 Lin Shaye as Carol Miller

Production notes
Director Jack Sholder was drawn to the film because of the script. Writer Jim Kouf has originally expressed interest in directing, but when the studios refused, he lost interest in the script. Sholder, who saw the potential to turn it into more than an action film, did a rewrite to heighten the themes of what it means to be human.  Casting for the film was difficult; they used auditions and could not cast Agent Gallagher until several days before shooting began. Sholder later called MacLachlan "an inspired choice", though Sholder clashed with Nouri. Nouri and McLachlan both liked the script, and, during auditions, agreed to do the film if the other was involved.

Interviewed by director Tim Hunter in 2000, Sholder recalled that the police station seen throughout the film was a set "built into some raw space at the Lincoln Heights Jail."

Soundtrack
The soundtrack was released on Varese Sarabande Records, Cassettes and CDs with the score by Michael Convertino.
The end credits states a soundtrack was released on I.R.S. Records.

Songs:

 "Hidden" – The Truth
 "Black Girl White Girl" – The Lords of the New Church
 "Is There Anybody In There?" – Hunters & Collectors
 "Say Good Bye" – Hunters & Collectors
 "On Your Feet" – Shok Paris
 "Going Down Fighting" – Shok Paris
 "Weapons of Love" – The Truth
 "Still in Hollywood" – Concrete Blonde
 "Your Haunted Head" – Concrete Blonde
 "While the Going's Good" – Twin Set & the Pearls
 "You Make Me Feel So Young" – Brian Gunboty
 "Out of Control (In My Car)" – ULI
 "Bad Girl" – Mendy Lee
 "Over Your Shoulder" – Concrete Blonde

Release
The film was released theatrically in the United States by New Line Cinema in October 1987. It turned out to be a modest hit for the company, grossing $9,747,988 at the box office.

The film was released on VHS and laserdisc by Media Home Entertainment in 1988. In August 1997, New Line Home Video re-released the film on VHS.

In 2000, New Line Home Entertainment released the film on special edition DVD. The film was re-released in a set including the sequel The Hidden II in 2005.

In August 2017, Warner Archive announced a remastered release of the film on Blu-ray format. It was released on September 12, 2017.

Reception
Rotten Tomatoes, a review aggregator, reports that 75% of 32 surveyed critics gave the film a positive review; the average rating is 6.9/10.  Variety wrote, "The Hidden is a well-constructed thriller, directed with swift assurance by Jack Sholder, brought down by an utterly conventional sci-fi ending."  Roger Ebert of the Chicago Sun-Times rated it 3/4 stars and called it "a surprisingly effective film".  Vincent Canby of The New York Times wrote, "The movie is mostly a series of automobile chases through Los Angeles, but there is also some humor."  Kevin Thomas of the Los Angeles Times, called it "as unstintingly violent as it is crudely ingenious".  Hal Hinson of The Washington Post wrote, "The Hidden is one of the most satisfying genre movies to hit the streets in a while."

In a 1992 retrospective, James M. Silver of the Los Angeles Times wrote that the film did not have a long enough release to attract a proper audience but is "outstanding".  It has since become a cult film.

Awards
 Jack Sholder won the Grand Prize at the Avoriaz Fantastic Film Festival in 1988.
 Jack Sholder won Best Director at Fantasporto in 1988. It was also nominated for Best Film at that festival.
 Michael Nouri won Best Actor at the Catalan International Film Festival in 1987. Jack Sholder took Prize of the International Critics’ Jury at the same festival.
 At the 1988 Saturn Awards, Michael Nouri was nominated for Best Actor, Jack Sholder was nominated for Best Director, Jim Kouf was nominated for best writing, and The Hidden was nominated for Best Science Fiction Film.

References

External links

 
 
 
 

1980s action thriller films
1980s science fiction horror films
1987 films
1987 horror films
American action thriller films
American buddy films
American horror thriller films
American independent films
American police detective films
American science fiction action films
American science fiction horror films
American serial killer films
Fictional portrayals of the Los Angeles Police Department
Films about extraterrestrial life
Films about terrorism in the United States
Films directed by Jack Sholder
Films scored by Michael Convertino
Films set in Los Angeles
New Line Cinema films
1980s English-language films
1980s American films